Daniel John Muckala is an American songwriter and producer.

Born in Minneapolis, Minnesota, United States, Muckala was a musical composition student at Belmont University in Tennessee.

Awards (selected)
 ASCAP Songwriter of the year 2011 
 Belmont's Curtain Call Award

Discography (selected)
Below is a selected discography for Dan Muckala.

 Britt Nicole - Gold
 Charice - One Day
 The Afters - Light Up the Sky
 Tiësto - Sweet Misery
 Backstreet Boys - Never Gone
 Backstreet Boys - Unbreakable
 Backstreet Boys - In a World Like This
 Nick Carter - I'm Taking Off
 Brandon Heath - Leaving Eden
 Brandon Heath - What If We
 Nick Lachey - What's Left of Me
 Leona Lewis - Echo
 MercyMe - The Generous Mr. Lovewell
 Mandy Moore - I Wanna Be with You
 LeAnn Rimes - I Need You
 Chris Tomlin - And If Our God Is for Us...
 Matt Maher - The Love in Between
 Garth Brooks - Man Against Machine
 Echosmith - Inside a Dream

References

External links 
[ AllMusic.com Page]
AlbumCredits.com Discography

1970 births
Living people
American male songwriters
Belmont University alumni
Businesspeople from Minneapolis
Record producers from Minnesota
Songwriters from Minnesota